Luis Godoy can refer to:

 Luis Godoy (boxer) (born 1952), a Colombian boxer
 Luis Godoy (footballer) (born 1978), a Chilean footballer